The 1979 Australasian Individual Speedway Championship was the fourth annual Australasian Final for Motorcycle speedway riders from Australia and New Zealand as part of the qualification for the 1979 Speedway World Championship.

In the track's final season of operation, the  Rowley Park Speedway in Adelaide hosted the Australasian Final. Reigning Australian Champion Billy Sanders won the Final from Steve Koppe and John Titman. The final three qualifiers for the Commonwealth Final to be held at London's White City Stadium were Phil Crump, Ivan Mauger and Larry Ross. Later in 1979 Mauger would go on to win his record 6th World Championship at the Silesian Stadium in Chorzów, Poland.

inaugural Australasian Final winner John Boulger failed on the night, scoring only 6 points from his 5 rides to finish in 11th place.

1979 Australasian Final
23 February
 Adelaide, Australia - Rowley Park Speedway
Referee: Torrie Kittlesen
Qualification: First 6 plus 1 reserve to the Commonwealth Final in London, England

References

See also
 Sport in Australia
 Motorcycle Speedway

Speedway in Australia
1979 in speedway
Individual Speedway Championship